Ethane-1,1-dithiol is an organosulfur compound with formula CH3CH(SH)2.  It is a colourless smelly liquid that is added to or found in some foods. The compound is an example of a geminal dithiol.

Use
Flavouring uses of ethane-1,1-dithiol may include drinks, oil, gravy, soup, meat, fruit, seasonings, and snacks.  Maximum concentrations in use that are generally recognised as safe (GRAS) is five parts per million (ppm) but typical uses are around 0.2 ppm. It is supplied as a 1% solution in ethanol, due to its strong offensive smell. In the diluted form with 4% ethyl acetate and ethanol the CAS number is 69382-62-3. Toxicity may be due to metabolism products hydrogen sulfide and acetaldehyde, however as used it has a margin of safety of over 10,000,000. Other ways that it is modified in the body apart from hydrolysis is methylation to 1-methylsulfanyl-ethanethiol, oxidation of the sulfur to an ethyl sulfonate, glucuronidation of the sulfur, or combination with cysteine by way of a disulfide bridge.

Identifiers
Since it is used in the food industry there are codes issued by various authorities. It is identified as JECFA number 1660. The Flavor and Extract Manufacturers Association (FEMA) id is 4111. The European designation for the flavouring is Fl 12.293.

Natural occurrence
It can be produced during fermentation of grapes. It is used as a food flavouring.

It is found naturally in the scent of durian.

Properties
The nuclear magnetic resonance spectrum shows three environments for protons, in the ratio of 3:2:1 corresponding to CH3 SH and CH.

Reactions
Ethane-1,1-dithiol has several reactions known that are important in white wine flavours. In the presence of oxygen, ethane-1,1-dithiol is converted to cis/trans-3,6-dimethyl-1,2,4,5-tetrathiane which has a rubbery aroma. This molecule has a ring with four sulfur atoms and two carbons, two ethane-1,1-dithiol molecules become linked at their sulfur atoms with the loss of hydrogen. This can further oxidise to cis/trans-3,5-dimethyl-1,2,4-trithiolane which has a meat-like odour.

Ethane-1,1-dithiol reacts with hydrogen sulfide to form cis/trans-4,7-dimethyl-1,2,3,5,6-pentathiepane, a ring containing five sulfur atoms and two carbons. This has a meaty smell.

Formation
Ethane-1,1-dithiol can be formed in the reaction of acetaldehyde with hydrogen sulfide. 1-Hydroxyethanethiol is formed as an intermediary.

See also 
Ethane-1,2-dithiol

References

External links
 
 
 

Thiols
Flavors
Foul-smelling chemicals